Shaun M. Purcell is a British genetic epidemiologist and statistical geneticist.

He is a senior associate member of the Broad Institute of MIT and Harvard and its Stanley Center for Psychiatric Research. He is also a faculty member at the Brigham and Women's Hospital Department of Psychiatry.

Having studied psychology and statistics at Oxford University, Purcell overcame the death of his supervisor David Fulker one year into a behavioural genetics programme at the Institute of Psychiatry to complete his Ph.D. under Pak Sham. He developed the PLINK genetics software during postdoctoral work with Mark Daly at the Whitehead Institute. He is also known for his research on the genetic bases of mental disorders such as schizophrenia and bipolar disorder, largely undertaken during faculty appointments at Massachusetts General Hospital and Mount Sinai in Manhattan.

References

External links

Living people
British emigrants to the United States
Genetic epidemiologists
Alumni of King's College London
Alumni of the University of Oxford
Statistical geneticists
Massachusetts General Hospital faculty
Icahn School of Medicine at Mount Sinai faculty
Psychiatric geneticists
Year of birth missing (living people)
British epidemiologists
British geneticists
British statisticians